Bence Biczó (born 19 January 1993) is a Hungarian swimmer and Youth Olympic Games gold medalist.

Biczó began swimming in 1999 and soon stood out with his talent. For 2005 he held almost all county records in his age group. To ensure his further development, in 2007 he moved with his family to Pécs, where he currently trains at the Pécsi Városi Sportiskola.

Biczó achieved his first success on the 2010 European Youth Swimming Championship, where he triumphed in the 200 m butterfly with a new youth record time of 1:55.82, which was the sixth best overall result in that year. Few months later, he has won the same event on the first Youth Olympic Games in Singapore, closing his record time to seventh hundredths (1:55.89). In November he participated on the 2010 European Short Course Swimming Championships, winning a bronze medal in his favourite stroke.

In 2011 Biczó further improved his personal best, as he swum 1:54.79 on the Hungarian championship and won the race ahead of László Cseh, the defending champion and Olympic silver medalist of the discipline in 2008.

References

External links
 

1993 births
Living people
Hungarian male swimmers
Male butterfly swimmers
Swimmers at the 2010 Summer Youth Olympics
Olympic swimmers of Hungary
Swimmers at the 2012 Summer Olympics
European Aquatics Championships medalists in swimming
Universiade medalists in swimming
Sportspeople from Pécs
Universiade gold medalists for Hungary
Youth Olympic gold medalists for Hungary
Medalists at the 2013 Summer Universiade
Medalists at the 2017 Summer Universiade
20th-century Hungarian people
21st-century Hungarian people